Brian Ezequiel Machuca (born 2 March 1995) is an Argentine professional footballer who plays as a centre-back for Club Almagro.

Club career
Machuca's career began in 2013 with Almirante Brown of Primera B Nacional. He was an unused substitute for fixtures with Gimnasia y Esgrima, Banfield and Nueva Chicago before making his professional bow on 3 June 2013 during a 1–3 loss against Olimpo. On 30 June, Machuca joined Primera C Metropolitana's Liniers on loan. After not featuring in 2013–14 as they were relegated, he made thirteen appearances in the 2014 Primera D Metropolitana. Machuca went back to Almirante Brown in 2015, with them now in Primera B Metropolitana. Goals versus Deportivo Español and Villa San Carlos arrived across four seasons.

In September 2019, following one hundred matches for Almirante Brown, Machuca completed a move to Mexican football with Ascenso MX side Alebrijes de Oaxaca. He didn't feature in the league for the club, though did appear in Copa MX games against Veracruz. On 3 February 2020, Machuca returned to his homeland with Primera B Nacional's Temperley. In July 2021, Machuca moved to fellow league club Almagro.

International career
Julio Olarticoechea called up Machuca to play with the Argentina U23s at the 2016 Sait Nagjee Trophy.

Career statistics
.

References

External links

1995 births
Living people
Footballers from Córdoba, Argentina
Argentine footballers
Argentina youth international footballers
Association football defenders
Argentine expatriate footballers
Expatriate footballers in Mexico
Argentine expatriate sportspeople in Mexico
Primera Nacional players
Primera D Metropolitana players
Primera B Metropolitana players
Club Almirante Brown footballers
Club Social y Deportivo Liniers players
Alebrijes de Oaxaca players
Club Atlético Temperley footballers
Club Almagro players